The 1913 Alabama Crimson Tide football team (variously "Alabama", "UA" or "Bama") represented the University of Alabama in the 1913 Southern Intercollegiate Athletic Association football season. It was the Crimson Tide's 21st overall and 18th season as a member of the Southern Intercollegiate Athletic Association (SIAA). The team was led by head coach D. V. Graves, in his third year, and played their home games at the University of Alabama Quad in Tuscaloosa and at Rickwood Field in Birmingham, Alabama. They finished the season with a record of six wins and three losses (6–3 overall, 4–3 in the SIAA).

Game summaries
The 81 points against Birmingham set a new school record. Bama lost their first game of the season against Georgia.

Schedule

References
General

 

Specific

Alabama
Alabama Crimson Tide football seasons
Alabama Crimson Tide football